Sophie Zelmani (born 12 February 1972), later raised with the surname Edkvist, is a Swedish singer-songwriter who released her first single in 1995, called "Always You".

Early life
Zelmani was born in the suburbs of Stockholm in 1972. Her father bought the family a guitar when Zelmani was 14. Despite no professional music training, Zelmani became a songwriter and recorded some songs at a local studio. After she mailed the demos to three record companies, Zelmani was offered a record deal by Sony Music Sweden.

Career
Sophie Zelmani recorded her debut, eponymous album with Sony in 1995. The album was produced and arranged by Lars Halapi and co-produced by Patrik Sventelius. She described the process of making the album: "In the beginning Lars and I spent a few months in the studio. We had fun and then picked the musicians. We recorded in two weeks but the whole thing took half a year." By 1997, Zelmani's debut album had sold 200,000 copies in Europe and Asia Pacific, before moving to the US market, distributed by Columbia Records. Zelmani said, "I had no ambitions to go abroad. I knew I wanted to make a record. That's all I wanted." Columbia's marketing campaign included CD sampler giveaways, consumer press, and rotation on Scandinavian Airlines (SAS) flights between Scandinavia and the US.

Zelmani has continued to record albums while making only a small number of public appearances due to shyness. She won a best newcomer award in Sweden's Grammy awards in 1996.

In popular culture
Zelmani has also contributed music to the TV series Buffy the Vampire Slayer and Dawson's Creek. Her cover of Bob Dylan's "Most of the Time" appears on the soundtrack to Masked and Anonymous.

Her song "Stand By" appeared in the film Independence Day (1996).  Her song "Always You" appeared in the film My Best Friend's Wedding (1997).

Zelmani's "Going Home" from Sing and Dance was covered in Mandarin Chinese as "Passenger" and Cantonese as "Withered Flower" by Faye Wong on To Love.

Discography

Albums

Singles

References

External links 

Official website
For track listings (song titles are almost all in English) see Swedish Wikipedia

1972 births
Living people
English-language singers from Sweden
Swedish songwriters
Swedish singer-songwriters
Singers from Stockholm
21st-century Swedish singers
21st-century Swedish women singers